The 1990–91 Luxembourg National Division was the 77th season of top level association football in Luxembourg.

Overview
It was performed in 10 teams, and Union Luxembourg won the championship.

First phase

Table

Results

Second phase

Championship stage

Table

Results

Relegation/Promotion stage

Group A

Table

Results

Group B

Table

Results

References
Luxembourg - List of final tables (RSSSF)

Luxembourg National Division seasons
Luxembourg
1